In chemistry, the CPK coloring (for Corey–Pauling–Koltun) is a popular color convention for distinguishing atoms of different chemical elements in molecular models.

History

August Wilhelm von Hofmann was apparently the first to introduce molecular models into organic chemistry, following August Kekule's introduction of the theory of chemical structure in 1858, and Alexander Crum Brown's introduction of printed structural formulas in 1861.  At a Friday Evening Discourse at London's Royal Institution on April 7, 1865, he displayed molecular models of simple organic substances such as methane, ethane, and methyl chloride, which he had had constructed from differently colored table croquet balls connected together with thin brass tubes.  Hofmann's original colour scheme (carbon = black, hydrogen = white, nitrogen = blue, oxygen = red, chlorine = green, and sulphur = yellow) has evolved into the later color schemes.  

In 1952, Corey and Pauling published a description of space-filling models of proteins and other biomolecules that they had been building at Caltech. Their models represented atoms by faceted hardwood balls, painted in different bright colors to indicate the respective chemical elements. Their color schema included
 White for hydrogen
 Black for carbon
 Sky blue for nitrogen
 Red for oxygen
They also built smaller models using plastic balls with the same color schema.

In 1965 Koltun patented an improved version of the Corey and Pauling modeling technique. In his patent he mentions the following colors:
 White for hydrogen
 Black for carbon
 Blue for nitrogen
 Red for oxygen
 Deep yellow for sulfur
 Purple for phosphorus
 Light, medium, medium dark, and dark green for the halogens (F, Cl, Br, I)
 Silver for metals (Co, Fe, Ni, Cu)

Typical assignments 

Typical CPK color assignments include:

Several of the CPK colors refer mnemonically to colors of the pure elements or notable compound. For example, hydrogen is a colorless gas, carbon as charcoal, graphite or coke is black, sulfur powder is yellow, chlorine is a greenish gas, bromine is a dark red liquid, iodine in ether is violet, amorphous phosphorus is red, rust is dark orange-red, etc. For some colors, such as those of oxygen and nitrogen, the inspiration is less clear.  Perhaps red for oxygen is inspired by the fact that oxygen is normally required for combustion or that the oxygen-bearing chemical in blood, hemoglobin, is bright red, and the blue for nitrogen by the fact that nitrogen is the main component of Earth's atmosphere, which appears to human eyes as being colored sky blue.

It is likely that the CPK colours were inspired by models in the nineteenth century. In 1865, August Wilhelm von Hofmann, in a talk at the Royal Institution in London, was using models made from croquet balls to illustrate valence, so he used the coloured balls available to him. (At the time, croquet was the most popular sport in England, so the balls were plentiful.) "On the Combining Power of Atoms", Chemical News, 12 (1865, 176-9, 189, states that "Hofmann, at a lecture given at the Royal Institution in April 1865 made use of croquet balls of different colours to represent various kinds of atoms (e.g. carbon black, hydrogen white, chlorine green, 'fiery' oxygen red, nitrogen blue)."

Modern variants 

The following table shows colors assigned to each element by some popular software products.

 Column C is the original assignment by Corey and Pauling.
 Column K is that of Koltun's patent.
 Column J is the color scheme used by the molecular visualizer Jmol.
 Column R is the scheme used by Rasmol; when two colors are shown, the second one is valid for versions 2.7.3 and later.
 Column P consists of the colors in the PubChem database managed by the United States National Institute of Health.

All colors are approximate and may depend on the display hardware and viewing conditions.

See also
 Ball-and-stick model
 Molecular graphics
 Software for molecular modeling

References

External links
Physical Molecular Models

Color codes
Molecular modelling